StreamMyGame is a software-only game streaming solution that enables Microsoft Windows-based games and applications to be played remotely on Windows and Linux devices. It was first released on 26 October 2007 as Windows-only software.

History 
On 14 January 2008 StreamMyGame launched a Linux version of its player. This new version made it possible to use a PlayStation 3 running Linux to remotely play Windows games. 

On the 3 June 2008 Sean Maloney, Intel Corporation Executive Vice President of Sales and Marketing demonstrated StreamMyGame at Computex 08 over a WiMAX connection using an Intel Mobile Internet Device to view and play the game Crysis.

On 17 July 2008 StreamMyGame announced that its Player was compatible with Intel's Atom range of processors and devices including Asus's EeePC netbook. In addition to streaming games over a local network, StreamMyGame can be used over broadband networks however these broadband connections require a minimum upload speed of 2 Mbit/s.

Architecture 
Members of StreamMyGames website can download and install a Server and Player application. The Server has to be installed on the same computer on which the games are installed. The Server automatically searches the user's hard drive for known games and uploads links to these games onto the StreamMyGame website. The Server is compatible with Windows XP, Windows Vista and Windows 7. The Player is installed on the computer or device on which the game is to be played and is compatible with Windows XP, Windows Vista and Windows 7 along with Ubuntu, Fedora, Red Hat, Xandros, Debian and Yellow Dog Linux. Both Server and Player software require continuous internet access. In addition to streaming games StreamMyGame enables its members to record games to a video file that can be uploaded to sites such as YouTube.

Use 
Members select a game they want to play on the StreamMyGame website, the website sends an encrypted message to the Server, the Server starts the game and captures its video and audio. The captured video and audio is sent to a Player via Real Time Streaming Protocol and displayed. The Player captures keyboard and mouse commands and sends these back to the Server where they are used to control the game.

Community 
StreamMyGame enables its members to interact via a bespoke Web 2.0 website that includes messaging, chat, forums and groups. Members can use group permissions to enable other members to share the use of their games. StreamMyGame's forums are predominantly used by its members to publish performance details of StreamMyGame when used with new and existing games.

See also 
 List of cloud gaming solution providers

References

External links 

Cloud gaming
Cloud gaming companies